Aruna Kori (born 15 March 1973) is an Indian politician and social worker. She represented Bilhaur constituency as MLA by Samajwadi Party. And she was also the Minister of Women Welfare  and Culture of Government of Uttar Pradesh.

Early life and education
A leader of Pragatisheel Samajwadi Party, Kori started her career at Samajwadi Party and she is the first woman to be Uttar Pradesh Minister of Women and Child development. She has been elected first time as a Member of legislative assembly from Bilhaur, Kanpur. She is Uttar Pradesh's youngest women minister.

References

1973 births
Living people
Women in Uttar Pradesh politics
Social workers
Members of the Uttar Pradesh Legislative Assembly
Samajwadi Party politicians
Indian Hindus
People from Kanpur
21st-century Indian women politicians
21st-century Indian politicians
Social workers from Uttar Pradesh
Women educators from Uttar Pradesh
Educators from Uttar Pradesh
Pragatisheel Samajwadi Party (Lohiya) politicians